is a Japanese animator, storyboard artist, and director.

Works (as director)
Kannazuki no Miko - (TV series, 2004)
Shattered Angels - (TV series, 2007)
Heaven's Lost Property the Movie: The Angeloid of Clockwork - (Film, 2011)
High School DxD - (TV series, 2012)
High School DxD New - (TV series, 2013)
Daimidaler: Prince vs Penguin Empire - (TV series, 2014)
Bladedance of Elementalers - (TV series, 2014)
High School DxD BorN - (TV series, 2015)
Zutto Mae Kara Suki Deshita: Kokuhaku Jikkō Iinkai - (Film, 2016)
Suki ni Naru Sono Shunkan o - (Film, 2016)
Senran Kagura Shinovi Master -Tokyo Yōma-hen- - (TV series, 2018)
Orient - (TV series, 2022)

References

External links

Japanese animators
Anime directors
Living people
Japanese animated film directors
Year of birth missing (living people)